The men's sprint competition of the Vancouver 2010 Olympics was held at Whistler Olympic Park in Whistler, British Columbia on February 14, 2010.

Results

References 
2010 Winter Olympics results: Men's 10 km Sprint, from https://web.archive.org/web/20091025194336/http://www.vancouver2010.com/; retrieved 2010-02-13.
 Competition Analysis

Sprint